Beyond the Fall of Night (1990) is a novel by Arthur C. Clarke and Gregory Benford. The first part of Beyond the Fall of Night is a reprint of Clarke’s  Against the Fall of Night while the second half is a "sequel" by Gregory Benford that takes place many years later.  This book is unrelated to The City and the Stars which is an expanded version of Against the Fall of Night which Clarke wrote himself three years after the publication of Against the Fall of Night.

Critical response
James Nicoll described Beyond the Fall of Night as "an atrocity" and "an abomination", saying that  it is "not just a bad book, the events in it can not happen
given the events in [Against]", and that the only thing it had in common with Against was "some character names".

Expanded version
The 1990 novella "Beyond the Fall of Night" was later expanded into the novel Beyond Infinity, with additional material and a change in the name and sex of the character.

References

External links 
 

Novels by Arthur C. Clarke
Novels by Gregory Benford
1990 British novels
1990 science fiction novels
Collaborative novels
British science fiction novels
Dying Earth (genre)
G. P. Putnam's Sons books